The 1921 Birmingham Moseley by-election was held on 4 March 1921 after the resignation of the incumbent Coalition Conservative MP, Hallewell Rogers.  It was retained by the Coalition Conservative candidate Patrick Hannon who was unopposed.

References 

By-elections to the Parliament of the United Kingdom in Birmingham, West Midlands constituencies
Unopposed by-elections to the Parliament of the United Kingdom in English constituencies
1921 elections in the United Kingdom
1921 in England
1920s in Birmingham, West Midlands
March 1921 events